Micrurus nigrocinctus, commonly known as the Central American coral snake, is a species of a highly venomous snake in the family Elapidae. The species is endemic to Latin America from southern  Mexico, Central America, to north Colombia. There are six recognized subspecies, including the nominate subspecies described here.

Common names
Common names for M. nigrocinctus include Central American coral snake, and in Spanish: serpiente-coralillo centroamericana, coral centroamericana, coralillo, gargantilla, salviara, limlim, babaspul, and coral macho.

Description
It has smooth scales, a rounded head, and eyes with round pupils. Its color pattern can vary from two-colored to three-colored, with black, yellow and red banding. The snout is black. Halfway the head, there is usually a yellow ring (in three-colored specimens) or a red ring (in bi-colored specimens). Color pattern on the body consists of often fairly broad red bands separated by much narrower sets of yellow-black-yellow bands. The numbers of black bands on the body may vary from 10 to 24, and an additional 3 to 8 on the tail.

Geographic range
Micrurus nigrocinctus ranges from southern Mexico through Central America (except Belize) to northwestern Colombia, and the western Caribbean.

Habitat

Behavior
M. nigrocinctus is mainly a terrestrial snake that often dwells in burrows, leaf litter, or under logs. Like most coral snakes it is usually nocturnal, though it may also be active at dusk and dawn, and sometimes after rainfall. It feeds on other snakes, small lizards, amphibians, and invertebrates. While usually not aggressive, it will bite when molested or restrained.

Reproduction
M. nigrocinctus is oviparous.

Venom
The Central American coral snake's venom contains a strong neurotoxin, causing neuromuscular dysfunction. Its LD50 is 0.3 mg/kg (IV), 1.7 mg/kg (SC) and 0.4 mg/kg(IP), the venom yield is 8 mg.

Subspecies
There are six (seven) recognized subspecies of Micrurus nigrocinctus:

Micrurus nigrocinctus babaspul 
Micrurus nigrocinctus coibensis 
Micrurus nigrocinctus divaricatus 
Micrurus nigrocinctus mosquitensis  - accepted as species (Micrurus mosquitensis)
Micrurus nigrocinctus nigrocinctus 
Micrurus nigrocinctus ovandoensis 
Micrurus nigrocinctus zunilensis 

Nota bene: A trinomial authority in parentheses indicates that the subspecies was originally described in a genus other than Micrurus.

References

Further reading
Freiberg M (1982). Snakes of South America. Hong Kong: T.F.H. Publications. 189 pp. . (Micrurus nigrocinctus, p. 116).
Girard C (1854). "Abstract of a Report to Lieut. James M. Gilliss, U. S. N., upon the Reptiles collected during the U. S. N. Astronomical Expedition to Chili [sic]". Proc. Acad. Nat. Sci. Philadelphia 7: 226-227. (Elaps nigrocinctus, new species, p. 226).

nigrocinctus
Reptiles described in 1854
Snakes of South America
Snakes of Central America
Reptiles of Guatemala
Reptiles of Honduras
Reptiles of El Salvador
Reptiles of Nicaragua
Reptiles of Costa Rica
Reptiles of Panama
Reptiles of Colombia
Snakes of the Caribbean